Amaurobius geminus is a species of spider in the family Amaurobiidae, found in Crete.

References

geminus
Spiders of Europe
Fauna of Crete
Spiders described in 2002